Cudahy is a city in Milwaukee County, Wisconsin, United States. The population was 18,204 at the 2020 census.

History
Originally known as the Buckhorn Settlement, it was renamed in the late 1800s when Patrick Cudahy purchased  of land in the Town of Lake, two miles (three kilometers) from the Milwaukee city limits, to build his meatpacking plant. The first village president was elected in 1895, and by 1906 Cudahy was incorporated as a city with a population of 2,556.

Geography

Cudahy is located at  (42.948416, −87.861010). The city is next door to the Milwaukee Mitchell International Airport.

Demographics

2010 census
At the 2010 census there were 18,267 people, 8,059 households, and 4,666 families living in the city. The racial makeup of the city was 88.8% White, 2.7% African American, 0.9% Native American, 1.4% Asian, 3.6% from other races, and 2.7% from two or more races. Hispanic or Latino of any race were 9.7%.

Out of 8,059 households, 27.0% had children under the age of 18 living with them, 40.7% were married couples living together, 11.8% had a female householder with no husband present, 5.4% had a male householder with no wife present, and 42.1% were non-families. 35.5% of households were made up of individuals, and 13.1% were one person aged 65 or older. The average household size was 2.26 and the average family size was 2.94.

The median age was 40.3 years. 21.5% of residents were under the age of 18; 7.8% were between the ages of 18 and 24; 26.6% were from 25 to 44; 28.3% were from 45 to 64; and 15.7% were 65 or older. The gender makeup of the city was 49.1% male and 50.9% female.

2000 census

At the 2000 census there were 18,429 people, 7,888 households, and 4,890 families living in the city. The population density was 3,880.1 people per square mile (1,498.0/km). There were 8,273 housing units at an average density of 1,741.8 per square mile (672.5/km).  The racial makeup of the city was 93.89% White, 0.95% African American, 0.81% Native American, 0.84% Asian, 0.03% Pacific Islander, 1.45% from other races, and 2.03% from two or more races. Hispanic or Latino of any race were 4.73%.

Out of 7,888 households, 28.0% had children under the age of 18 living with them, 46.6% were married couples living together, 11.6% had a female householder with no husband present, and 37.9% were non-families. 32.5% of households were one person and 12.8% were one person aged 65 or older. The average household size was 2.32 and the average family size was 2.94.

The age distribution was 23.0% under the age of 18, 8.0% from 18 to 24, 31.3% from 25 to 44, 21.9% from 45 to 64, and 15.8% 65 or older. The median age was 38 years. For every 100 females, there were 95.6 males. For every 100 females age 18 and over, there were 92.9 males.

The median household income was US$40,157, and the median family income was $49,082. Males had a median income of $36,787 versus $25,882 for females. The per capita income for the city was $19,615. About 5.6% of families and 8.2% of the population were below the poverty line, including 11.1% of those under age 18 and 6.3% of those age 65 or over.

Education

The Cudahy School District provides public education for the area. Cudahy High School is the local high school.

St. Paul's Lutheran School is a K4–8 Christian grade school of the Wisconsin Evangelical Lutheran Synod in Cudahy.

Government
Cudahy is represented by Gwen Moore (D) in the United States House of Representatives, and by Ron Johnson (R) and Tammy Baldwin (D) in the United States Senate. Chris Larson (D) represents Cudahy in the Wisconsin State Senate, and Christine Sinicki (D) represents Cudahy in the Wisconsin State Assembly.

Notable people 

 Albert M. Bielawski, Michigan State Representative
 Frank Chermak, Wisconsin legislator
 Patrick Cudahy, Founder of Cudahy and Cudahy Packing Company
 Barney Augustus Eaton, Wisconsin legislator
 Lamar Gordon, NFL Running Back
 Lawrence P. Kelly, mayor of Cudahy and legislator
 Frank Kosikowski, professional football player
 Jim Miklaszewski, NBC News correspondent for the Pentagon
 Vaughn Monroe, Big Band era singer, lived in Cudahy for a time as a child
 John Navarre, NFL quarterback
 Sherman R. Sobocinski, Wisconsin legislator
 George C. Windrow, Wisconsin legislator

See also
Impact of the 2019–20 coronavirus pandemic on the meat industry in the United States

References

External links
 City of Cudahy

Cities in Wisconsin
Cities in Milwaukee County, Wisconsin
Cudahy family
Wisconsin populated places on Lake Michigan